Dating back to the early 90s, high school friends started using the term "LYLAS" (Love You Like A Sister) when sending correspondence in classes. This correspondence is not found in today's classrooms. 

Historically, kids used pen, or pencil, and paper. Thumb strains were not as common as they are with today's teens. More hand strains and cramping were an issue, so creating clever acronyms to display ones feelings were becoming more and more popular. Disciplinarian figures would often take this notes away from the teens, causing stress, anxiety, and pissed off kids. 

Internet slang